Mark Jeffrey is an American author and entrepreneur. He is known for authoring The New York Times bestselling books, Max Quick Series.

Most recently, Jeffrey founded Guardian Circle, an app-based personal safety network for friends, family and neighbors.

Jeffrey's previous companies include The Palace (backed by Time Warner, Intel and SoftBank; sold to Communities.com in 1998 with 10 million users), ZeroDegrees (sold to InterActiveCorp / IAC in 2004 with 1 million users), ThisWeekIn (co-founded with Kevin Pollak and Jason Calacanis), and Mahalo.com/ Inside.com (backed by Elon Musk, Sequoia, Mark Cuban and others). Mark also consulted for several years directly for Travis Kalanick, the founder of Uber, on his first company, Red Swoosh.

Jeffrey's first novel, Max Quick: The Pocket and the Pendant, was published in hardcover and ebook by HarperCollins in May, 2011. The book was initially podcast as a series of episodic mp3's and received over 2.5 million downloads.

Jeffrey holds a B.S. degree in Computer Science from the University of New Hampshire and is a TEDx speaker. On Twitter, he is @markjeffrey.

Bibliography
Timewarden (2016)
The Case for Bitcoin (2015)
Bitcoin Explained Simply (2014)
Prisoner of Glass (2014)
Max Quick: The Bane of the Bondsman (2013) (HarperCollins) 
Max Quick: The Two Travelers (2012) (HarperCollins)
Armand Ptolemy and the Golden Aleph (2012) 
Max Quick: The Pocket and the Pendant (2011) (HarperCollins)  
Age of Aether (2011)

References

External links

Year of birth missing (living people)
Living people
American businesspeople
American writers